Strasburg Stone and Earthenware Manufacturing Company, also known as the Strasburg Museum, Steam Pottery, and Southern Railroad Station, is a historic factory building located at Strasburg, Shenandoah County, Virginia. It was built in 1891, and is a two-story, 10 bay brick building originally constructed for the Strasburg Stone and Earthenware Manufacturing Company to make earthenware.  It was converted to railroad use in 1913, at which time a one-story pent roof was added.  The building is covered with a slate-clad hipped roof surmounted by a hipped monitor.  The building served as a station and depot for the Southern Railroad.

The Strasburg Museum opened in the building in 1970.   Displays include railroad artifacts and a model railroad, Strasburg pottery, Native American artifacts, period rooms, and items from the American Civil War.

It was listed on the National Register of Historic Places in 1979.

References

External links
Strasburg Museum - official site
Strasburg Museum building history and photos

Industrial buildings and structures on the National Register of Historic Places in Virginia
Industrial buildings completed in 1891
Buildings and structures in Shenandoah County, Virginia
National Register of Historic Places in Shenandoah County, Virginia
Stations along Southern Railway lines in the United States
Railroad museums in Virginia
Ceramics manufacturers of the United States
History museums in Virginia